Club San Martín is a sports club based in Corrientes, Argentina. The basketball team currently plays in the Torneo Nacional de Ascenso (TNA), the second division of the Argentine Liga Nacional de Básquetbol league system.

History
San Martín was founded by some management leaders of former Club 9 de Julio, which had recently closed. Those men decided to create an institution which served as a social place where people could meet and practise sports. Originally, the club was named "Robson Tenis Club", as a homage to local tennis champion Guillermo Robson. In that assembly, Dr. Antonio Peluffo was appointed as the first president of the institution. 

From the beginning the club hosted diverse activities such as basketball, tennis, track and field, table tennis and swimming.

One year after (1933), San Martín acquired the lands for setting up its headquarters (in the corner of Salta and Moreno streets), which remains the same nowadays.

In 2022, San Martin was the runner-up in the 2022 Liga Sudamericana de Básquetbol, losing to Bauru from Brazil in the Grand Final in Buenos Aires.

Honours 
Liga Sudamericana de Básquetbol

 Runners-up (1): 2022

Players

Current roster

2019-20 season:

Notable players

  Justin Keenan

References

External links
Official website

S
S